The Coronophorales are an order of fungi in the class Sordariomycetes. According to a 2008 estimate, the order consisted of 4 families, 26 genera, and 87 species. This was changed in 2020, it then had 6 families, with 46 genera.

Families
 Bertiaceae (2 genera)
 Ceratostomataceae (16)
 Chaetosphaerellaceae (3)
 Coronophoraceae (1)
 Nitschkiaceae (13) 
 Scortechiniaceae (11)

Genera incertae sedis
As of 2020;
 Papulaspora  (33 species)
 Sphaerodes  (9)
 Tengiomyces  (1)*

References

 
Ascomycota orders
Taxa named by John Axel Nannfeldt
Taxa described in 1932